John Giovanni Battista (Joyce B.) Giglioni (January 18, 1929 – January 23, 2008) was an American business theorist, and professor of management and international business at Mississippi State University. He is notable for his 1974 article, "A Conspectus of Management Control Theory: 1900-1972", co-authored with Arthur G. Bedeian.

Biography 
Giglioni received a BBA in 1958, and an MBA in 1959 at Tulane University. In 1960, Giglioni was appointed instructor in management at Tulane University. In 1969, he received a PhD from Indiana University, under the supervision of Charles F. Bosner, with the thesis entitled, "Multiple Correlation Analysis for Manpower Forecasting: A Case Study."

After graduation, Giglioni moved to Mississippi State University, where he became Associate Professor of Management and Director of the Manpower Research Center. Later in the 1970s he was appointed Professor of Management. Arthur G. Bedeian was his Ph.D. student.

Selected publications 
 Giglioni, Giovanni Battista. Multiple Correlation Analysis for Manpower Forecasting: A Case Study. Diss. Indiana University, 1968.
 Giovanni B. Giglioni, Manpower planning for selected manufacturing industries in Mississippi. Division of Business Research, College of Business and Industry, Mississippi State University. 1970

Articles, a selection
 Giglioni, Giovanni B., and Arthur G. Bedeian. "A conspectus of management control theory: 1900-1972." Academy of Management Journal 17.2 (1974): 292-305.
 Giovanni B. Giglioni, Joyce B. Giglioni, and James A. Bryant, "Performance Appraisal: Here Comes the Judge," California Management Review 26 (Winter 1981), pp. 14–23

References 

1929 births
2008 deaths
American business theorists
Tulane University alumni
Mississippi State University alumni
Tulane University faculty
Mississippi State University faculty